Como yo no hay dos is a 1952 Argentine film.

Cast

External links
 

1952 films
1950s Spanish-language films
Argentine black-and-white films
Films directed by Kurt Land
Argentine comedy films
1952 comedy films
1950s Argentine films